Chunnam Techno University is a private technical university in South Korea. Its campus is located in Gokseong County, South Jeolla province.  The current president is Cho Sung Soo .

Academics

The undergraduate offerings are divided among four divisions (IT, International Tourism, Physical Education, and Tae Kwon Do), as well as a number of unaffiliated departments (such as automotive repair, music, and social welfare).  A mixture of two- and three-year programs are provided.

History

The school opened in 1991.  It was founded by the Okgwa Foundation, which had previously established middle and high schools.

Sister schools
Ties exist with universities in the following countries:  Austria, Canada, France, China, Japan, Malaysia, the Philippines, and the United States.

Notable alumni
Jo In-sung, actor

See also
Education in South Korea
List of colleges and universities in South Korea

External links
Official school website, in Korean

Vocational education in South Korea
Universities and colleges in South Jeolla Province
Gokseong County
1991 establishments in South Korea
Educational institutions established in 1991